The IEEE Journal of Solid-State Circuits is a monthly peer-reviewed scientific journal on new developments and research in solid-state circuits, published by the Institute of Electrical and Electronics Engineers (IEEE) in New York City. The journal serves as a companion venue for expanding on work presented at the International Solid-State Circuits Conference, the Symposia on VLSI Technology and Circuits, and the Custom Integrated Circuits Conference. The journal has an impact factor of 6.12 and is edited by Pavan Kumar Hanumolu (University of Illinois Urbana-Champaign).

References

External links

Journal of Solid-State Circuits
Electronics journals
Semiconductor journals
Monthly journals
English-language journals
Publications with year of establishment missing